Acleris lorquiniana, the marsh button, is a species of moth of the family Tortricidae. It is found in Iran and central and northern Europe, where it has been recorded from Great Britain, France, Belgium, the Netherlands, Germany, Denmark, Austria, Switzerland, the Czech Republic, Slovakia, Poland, Romania, Hungary, Sweden, Finland, the Baltic region and Russia. The habitat consists of damp fenland.

The wingspan is 15–20 mm. The forewings are brownish ochreous. Adults are on wing from June to July and again from September to October in two generations per year.

The larvae feed on Lythrum salicaria. They feed on the shoots, flowers and seeds of their host plant. Pupation takes place in debris on the ground. The species overwinters as an adult.

References

Moths described in 1835
lorquiniana
Moths of Europe
Moths of Asia